The Pindad P3 is a double action/single action semi-automatic pistol made by PT Pindad, intended to be a compact and unobtrusive pistol. The Pindad P3 is chambered in .32 ACP and has a magazine capacity of 12. The sight on the P3 is a tritium three dot sight that was also used on the P1 and P2.

References

.32 ACP semi-automatic pistols
Semi-automatic pistols of Indonesia